Manuel Vidrio Solís (born 23 August 1972) is a Mexican former professional footballer who played as a centre-back.

He has been capped for the Mexico national team, including four games at the 2002 FIFA World Cup. He was also part of the Mexico squad at the 1992 Summer Olympics.

A rugged and combative central defender, Vidrio played for Chivas until 1996. He then spent two seasons at Toluca and three at UAG Tecos before joining Pachuca, where he became one of the most effective defenders in Mexico. Lining up in a tough back line that also included Mexico internationales Alberto Rodriguez and Octavio Valdez, later joined by Francisco Gabriel de Anda, Vidrio helped Pachuca to its first national professional title in the Invierno 1999 season. The team went on to win the Invierno 2001 and Apertura 2003 championships as well. Vidrio retired after a short stint with Veracruz in 2006.

Although he earned a number of caps in the mid-1990s, beginning in 1993, Vidrio's international career did not take off until the appointment of Pachuca coach Javier Aguirre as Mexican national coach in 2001. Vidrio was installed in the starting lineup for Aguirre's first match, a 1–0 win over the United States, and he remained a fixture in the first team through the qualifiers, the Copa America, and the World Cup. His final cap was also against the United States, in the 2-0 second-round loss in Jeonju that eliminated Mexico from the tournament and signaled the end of Aguirre's first spell in command of the national team.

Personal life
He and his wife Rosany Sahagun, have 3 daughters.

Career statistics

International goals

|- 
| 1. || August 23, 2001 || Veracruz, Mexico ||  || 5–4 || Win || Friendly
|}

Honours
Pachuca
Mexican Primera División: Invierno 1999, Invierno 2001, Apertura 2003
CONCACAF Champions' Cup: 2002

References

External links

1972 births
Living people
Mexican footballers
Mexican football managers
C.D. Guadalajara footballers
Deportivo Toluca F.C. players
Tecos F.C. footballers
C.F. Pachuca players
La Liga players
CA Osasuna players
Liga MX players
C.D. Veracruz footballers
Tecos F.C. managers
Olympic footballers of Mexico
Footballers at the 1992 Summer Olympics
1995 King Fahd Cup players
2002 FIFA World Cup players
Mexico international footballers
Mexican expatriates in Spain
Expatriate footballers in Spain
Association football defenders
Footballers from Jalisco